USS Beacon may refer to:

  was a  built in Canada initially for the US but which served in the Royal Navy as 
  was an  during the Vietnam War

Beacon